Dulab or Doolab or Dowlab may refer to:
 Dulab-e Karanlu, East Azerbaijan Province
 Dulab-e Bala, Fars Province
 Dulab-e Pain, Fars Province
 Dulab, Hormozgan
 Dulab, Isfahan
 Dulab, Manujan, Kerman Province
 Dulab, Qaleh Ganj, Kerman Province
 Dulab-e Shirin, Kohgiluyeh and Boyer-Ahmad Province
 Dulab-e Talkh, Kohgiluyeh and Boyer-Ahmad Province
 Dulab, Kurdistan
 Dulab, Yazd
 Dulab, Zanjan
 Dulab Rural District, in Hormozgan Province